Mariya Timofeyevna Shubina (born 12 May 1930) is a Soviet sprint canoeist who competed from the late 1950s to the late 1960s. She won the K-2 500 m gold medal at the 1960 Summer Olympics in Rome. Shubina also won six medals at the ICF Canoe Sprint World Championships with four golds (K-1 500 m: 1963, K-2 500 m: 1958, K-4 500 m: 1963, 1966) and two silvers (K-2 500 m: 1963, 1966).

Shubina was born in a family of a phone communications engineer in Mordovia. In 1944 she enrolled to a gynecology school, and after graduating worked at a regional hospital. A keen cross-country skier and runner, she used to ski or run to work. In 1950 she enrolled to Kazan State Medical University, where she continued training and competing in ski and athletics. Her first canoe race was accidental – she was asked to replace a missing teammate; she did not even know how to swim. A canoe coach noticed her then and convinced to start training.

In 1956 Shubina graduated from the Kazan University, and later studied sport medicine in Saint Petersburg. Since 1964 she lives in Volgograd, together with her husband and sons Konstantin and Mikhail. In 1975 she defended a PhD in medicine.

References

External links

1930 births
Living people
Canoeists at the 1960 Summer Olympics
Olympic gold medalists for the Soviet Union
Olympic canoeists of the Soviet Union
Soviet female canoeists
Olympic medalists in canoeing
Russian female canoeists
ICF Canoe Sprint World Championships medalists in kayak

Medalists at the 1960 Summer Olympics
Sportspeople from Mordovia